The 1922 Gonzaga Bulldogs football team was an American football team that represented Gonzaga University during the 1922 college football season. In their third year under head coach Gus Dorais, the Bulldogs compiled a 5–3 record and outscored their opponents 215 to 79.

Dorais' 1922 lineup included back Hust Stockton and end Ray Flaherty. Flaherty later played ten years in the National Football League (NFL) and was inducted into the Pro Football Hall of Fame. Stockton played five years in the NFL and is the grandfather of NBA great John Stockton.

The new Gonzaga Stadium opened this season; the first game was against Washington State on October 14, won by the Cougars with a late field goal,  After the opening loss, Gonzaga was undefeated in the next ten games at the stadium, with eight wins and two ties.

This year marked the only bowl appearance for the Gonzaga football program, the San Diego East-West Christmas Classic, where they fell 13–21 to favored West Virginia on Christmas Day.

References

Gonzaga
Gonzaga Bulldogs football seasons
Gonzaga Bulldogs football